The OPANAL (which stands for el Organismo para la Proscripción de las Armas Nucleares en la América Latina y el Caribe) is an international organization which promotes a non-aggression pact and nuclear disarmament in much of the Americas. In English, its name is the Agency for the Prohibition of Nuclear Weapons in Latin America and the Caribbean. The agency was created as a result of the Treaty of Tlatelolco, ratified in 1969, which forbids its signatory nations from use, storage, or transport of nuclear weapons.

The first official Secretary General was Leopoldo Benites from Ecuador.

Member nations

See also
Association of Caribbean States
Community of Latin American and Caribbean States
International Atomic Energy Agency
International Campaign to Abolish Nuclear Weapons
 Nuclear Weapons: The Road to Zero
 Anti-nuclear organizations
 List of books about nuclear issues
 List of films about nuclear issues

References

External links
OPANAL.org - official site, English and Spanish versions

Politics of the Americas
Politics of the Caribbean
Politics of Central America
Anti–nuclear weapons movement
Latin America and the Caribbean